The Tsanfleuron Glacier is a  long glacier (2005) situated in the western Bernese Alps in the cantons of Valais and Vaud in Switzerland. It culminates at the Dôme, at approximately 3,000 metres above sea level, where it is separated from the Diablerets Glacier. The lowest point is at approx. 2,500 metres. The glacier is overlooked by the Scex Rouge and the Oldenhorn on the north, and by the Quille du Diable on the south.

Most of the glacier is used as a ski area and is better known under the name of the company operating the ski area Glacier 3000 or Glacier des Diablerets (the latter is in fact a nearby smaller glacier on the summit of the Diablerets). The area can be reached easily from the Scex Rouge station with the help of a chairlift. Several secured paths allow pedestrians to walk on the glacier. Snow buses are also operated on the glacier.

In July 2017, the frozen bodies of a Swiss couple who went missing in 1942 were discovered on the glacier by a local ski-resort employee, their bodies exposed by the receding glacier.

See also
List of glaciers in Switzerland
Swiss Alps

References

External links
Swisstopo maps
Swiss glacier monitoring network, glaciology.ethz.ch

Glaciers of Switzerland
Glaciers of Valais
Glaciers of the Alps
Valais–Vaud border